Aquimarina aggregata  is a Gram-negative, strictly aerobic, rod-shaped and agarolytic bacterium from the genus of Aquimarina which has been isolated from seawater from the Yellow Sea in China.

References

External links
Type strain of Aquimarina aggregata at BacDive -  the Bacterial Diversity Metadatabase

Flavobacteria
Bacteria described in 2016